Sizdah Bedar ( – ), (lit. 'Getting Rid of Thirteen') also known as Nature's Day ( – ), is an Iranian festival held annually on the thirteenth day of Farvardin (same as Aries), the first month of the Iranian calendar, during which people spend time picnicking outdoors. It marks the end of the Nowruz holidays in Iran.

History  
Generally, among Iranian festivals, "Sizdah Bedar" is a bit vague in terms of historical roots. There is no direct mention of such a celebration in history books prior to Qajar era. But in ancient sources, such as Shahnameh, there is a reference to "the thirteenth day of Farvardin". The popular belief is that ancient Iranians celebrated the 13th day of Nowruz after twelve days of celebrating, each day represents a month of the year. It was an official ending to Nowruz and a beginning to the remaining twelve months of the year.

Zoroastrianism background  

In ancient times, there was a name for each day of the month. For example, the first day of each month was called "Ormazd Rooz", and the thirteenth day of each month was called "Tir Rooz" and belonged to "Izad Tir" (the god of Tir). The word "Rooz" means "day" in Persian. The word "Tir" is called "Tishtariah" in the Avestan language. It is the same as the name of Tishter, the god of rain. So, we can say that Tir was a symbol of divine kindness among ancient Iranians because rain is symbolically equal to god's kindness and generosity in Persian culture. Nature Day is the ancient Persian tradition of celebrating the occasion of the god of rain's victory over the drought-inducing demon. Celebrating this day was customary even before the emergence of Asho Zoroastrianism (1800 BC).

As stated in the book From Nowruz to Nowruz by Mr. Kourosh Niknam (MP for Zoroastrianism), pp. 41 and 42, "the thirteenth day of Farvardin is called Tir or Teshtar." In Avesta, "Teshtar" is the god of rain. Before Asho Zoroaster, for the rain god to overcome the drought demon, people believed that they should worship this god on this particular day and ask for rain. In ancient Iran, after celebrating the 13th day of Nowruz, which was the beginning of an agricultural semi-year, Iranians went to their fields and farms or plains and deserts and the banks of rivers to worship. They would rejoice and dance and happily asked for rain.

Etymology  
According to some Iranians’ belief the number thirteen is ominous. Sizdah Bedar, therefore, means "getting rid of the ominous of the day thirteen". Going on a picnic in the heart of nature and natural places is one way to do so. According to the Dehkhoda Dictionary, "dar" means "valley and plain" and "be" means "towards". Thus "Sizdah Bedar" means "towards the valley on the thirteenth day".

Observances

Sizdah Be-dar is celebrated on the thirteenth day of Nowruz, the Iranian New Year. It is celebrated by going outside to be in nature and spend the day outdoors.

Releasing sprouted greens back into nature

A custom performed at the end of the picnic is to throw the sprouted greens ( – ) that were part of the traditional Haft-Seen Nowruz display into moving water. Touching someone else's greens on this day or bringing the plants back home is considered bad luck.

Knotting the greens 
Knotting the stems of the greens (سبزه گره زدن – sabzeh gereh zadan) before tossing them into the water is a customary ritual for young single people, especially for young women. This indicates a wish to find a partner or a husband.

Lie of the Thirteen
Lie of the Thirteenth (دروغ سیزده – dorūgh-e sīzdah), which is similar to April Fools' Day, is observed on the first or second day of April in Iran, on the day of Sizdah Bedar. Pranks have reportedly been played on this holiday since 536 BC in the Achaemenid Empire.

Food of Sizdah Bedar

Sekanjabin and lettuce 
Sekanjabin is a very old Iranian drink. The Persians make it with vinegar, honey, and sometimes mint. It is very popular in summer, but it is also an inseparable part of Sizdah Bedar. Iranians eat lettuce with Sekanjabin. This act is symbolically a promise to stay healthy during the New Year.

Ash-e Doogh 
Ash-e doogh, (Persian: آش دوغ), also known as "yogurt soup", originates from the Azeri region of northwest Iran and is one of the traditional soups of Ardabil. It is a common dish found in many regions and cultures within West Asia, including Iran, Azerbaijan, and Turkey.

See also

 Nowruz
 Iranian festivals
 Public holidays piche

References

 Outdoor Moments of Sizdah Bedar: A Reference Article by M. Saadat Noury

External links
 Sizdah-Bedar in Delft (Netherlands) on YouTube (Video)
 Animation about Sizdah-Bedar on YouTube (Video)

March observances
April observances
Nowruz
Persian words and phrases
Observances set by the Solar Hijri calendar
Spring (season) events in Iran